The 2009–10 season was the 130th season of competitive football in England.

The 2009 season officially began on 8 August 2009 for the Championship, League One and, League Two, and 
15 August for the Premier League. The Championship season finished on 2 May 2010, with the Premier League, League One and League Two concluding on the weekend of 8-9 May.

Promotion and relegation (pre-season)
Teams promoted to 2009–10 Premier League
 Wolverhampton Wanderers
 Birmingham City
 Burnley

Teams relegated from 2008–09 Premier League
 Newcastle United
 Middlesbrough
 West Bromwich Albion

Teams promoted to 2009–10 Football League Championship
 Leicester City
 Peterborough United
 Scunthorpe United

Teams relegated from 2008–09 Football League Championship
 Norwich City
 Southampton (started on −10 points for administration entrance)
 Charlton Athletic

Teams promoted to 2009–10 Football League One
 Brentford
 Exeter City
 Wycombe Wanderers
 Gillingham

Teams relegated from 2008–09 Football League One
 Northampton Town
 Crewe Alexandra
 Cheltenham Town
 Hereford United

Teams promoted to 2009–10 Football League Two
 Burton Albion
 Torquay United

Teams relegated from 2008–09 Football League Two
 Chester City (started on −25 points and expelled from the Football Conference 10 March 2010)
 Luton Town

Managerial changes

Notes
1 Sampson was named caretaker manager following Gray's departure on 8 September and appointed full-time on 5 October.
2 McDermott was named caretaker manager following Rogers' departure on 17 December and was appointed full-time on 27 January.
3 Simpson was named caretaker manager on 3 March and appointed full-time on 14 April.
4 Keith Millen will remain caretaker manager until the end of the season when Coppell will take charge.

Diary of the season

July 2009
1 July: Portuguese forward Cristiano Ronaldo completed his world record £80 million move from Manchester United to Real Madrid. English defender Glen Johnson switched from Portsmouth to Liverpool for £18 million, one of the highest fees ever paid for a defender. English midfielder Gareth Barry ended 11 years at Aston Villa and signed for Manchester City for £12 million.

6 July: Chelsea signed Russian winger Yuri Zhirkov from CSKA Moscow for £18 million.

26 July: An England XI defeated a Germany XI 3–2 at St James' Park, Newcastle, in a charity match raising money for the cancer charity of former England manager Sir Bobby Robson. Robson, who has fought the illness since 1992 and gone into remission four times, attended the match in a wheelchair.

27 July: English striker Peter Crouch, who began his career with Tottenham Hotspur as an apprentice but left without playing for them, returned to White Hart Lane in a £9 million move from Portsmouth.

31 July: Sir Bobby Robson died, aged 76.

August 2009
5 August: Sunderland paid a club record £10 million for England and Tottenham Hotspur striker Darren Bent. Liverpool sold Spanish midfielder Xabi Alonso to Real Madrid for £30 million.

12 August: England came back from 2–0 down to draw 2–2 against Netherlands in Amsterdam thanks to two goals made by Jermain Defoe.

14 August: Bryan Gunn became the first managerial casualty of the season when his contract was terminated by Norwich City of League One.

15 August: The new Premier League season kicks off, with the highlight of the opening day coming at Goodison Park where Arsenal trounce Everton 6–1 in the biggest opening day victory at this level for 15 years. Burnley's returned to the top flight after 33 years away began on a low note when an own goal by Stephen Jordan contributed to a 2–0 defeat against Stoke City.

19 August: Burnley achieved a shocking 1–0 home win over Manchester United, with the only goal of the match coming from veteran striker Robbie Blake.

23 August: The highlight of the second weekend of the Premier League season came when Burnley achieves another shocking 1–0 win, this time over Everton after French striker Louis Saha missed a penalty.

25 August: Some of the worst scenes of football hooliganism in years are witnessed in West Ham United's 3–1 home win over Millwall in the League Cup second round. Fans invaded the pitch twice and there was widespread violence in the stands and the streets surrounding Upton Park, including an incident in which a man suffered stab wounds. Manchester City pays £22 million for Everton and England defender Joleon Lescott.

27 August: Tottenham Hotspur manager Harry Redknapp suggested West Ham and Millwall should never be allowed to play each other in a cup competition again.

31 August: The first month of the Premier League season ended with Chelsea as leaders, level on 12 points with second-placed Tottenham Hotspur. Defending champions Manchester United are third, with underdogs Stoke City standing fourth after a strong start to the season.

September 2009
1 September: Everton signed Dutch defender Johnny Heitinga from Atlético Madrid for £6 million.

9 September: England secured qualification for the 2010 FIFA World Cup after a 5–1 win over Croatia at Wembley Stadium.

20 September: The Manchester derby at Old Trafford produced one of the most thrilling matches of the season as United defeated Manchester City 4–3 thanks to a stoppage time winner by Michael Owen.

30 September: Manchester United and Chelsea are levels on 18 points at the top of the Premier League, three points ahead of their nearest rivals Liverpool and Tottenham Hotspur. Arsenal and Manchester City complete the top six. Portsmouth are bottom of the table after starting the season with a record seven consecutive defeats, joined in the relegation zone by West Ham United and Hull City.

October 2009
2 October: Sheffield United striker Jordan Robertson is jailed for 32 months on a charge of causing death by dangerous driving in relation to a fatal car crash on the M1 motorway in December 2008.

17 October: Sunderland defeat Liverpool 1–0 at the Stadium of Light after Darren Bent's shot is deflected in off a beachball.

21 October: Gareth Southgate's contract as manager of Middlesbrough is terminated, despite them standing fourth in the Championship one season after relegation from the Premier League.
26 October 2009: Gordon Strachan is appointed as Middlesbrough's new manager, five months after resigning from Celtic.

29 October: Wigan Athletic striker Marlon King has his contract terminated by the club after receiving an 18-month prison sentence for assaulting a woman in a nightclub. It is the second time King has been in convicted and incarcerated, having also received an 18-month prison sentence in 2002 when convicted of driving a stolen car.

31 October: October draws to a close with Chelsea now two points ahead of Manchester United, with the rest of the top four unchanged from the end of last month. Portsmouth remains bottom, but have now gained their first seven points of the season, while West Ham and Hull City complete the bottom three once again.

November 2009
30 November: November ended with Chelsea two points ahead of Manchester United and with a match in hand, while the only change to the rest of the top six is that Aston Villa has displaced Liverpool, who are now seventh. Portsmouth remain bottom, now joined in the relegation zone by Wolverhampton Wanderers and Bolton Wanderers.

December 2009
13 December: Brian Laws left Championship strugglers Sheffield Wednesday after three years as manager.

15 December: Brendan Rodgers is sacked after six months as manager of Reading, who are battling relegation from the Championship just months after almost being promoted under his predecessor Steve Coppell.

16 December: The 11 venues for England's 2018 World Cup bid are announced. Three stadiums in London will feature – Wembley (national team), Emirates Stadium (Arsenal) and either the Olympic Stadium or a rebuilt White Hart Lane (Tottenham Hotspur). Birmingham (Aston Villa's Villa Park), Bristol (a proposed new stadium for Bristol City), Leeds (Leeds United's Elland Road), Liverpool (the current Anfield stadium or its replacement), Milton Keynes (Stadium:mk, home of Milton Keynes Dons), Nottingham (new Nottingham Forest stadium), Manchester (Old Trafford and the City of Manchester Stadium), Newcastle (St James' Park), Plymouth (Home Park), Sheffield (Sheffield Wednesday's Hillsborough) and Sunderland (Stadium of Light) have also been selected as venues if England are accepted as hosts.

19 December: Despite being sixth in the Premier League and being on course for their highest league finish in nearly 20 years, Manchester City sack manager Mark Hughes and appoint Italian Robert Mancini as his successor.

22 December: Albert Scanlon, former Manchester United winger who survived the Munich air disaster in 1958, dies at age 74 after a two-month illness. There are now just four players who survived the crash still alive.

30 December: Premier League strugglers Bolton Wanderers sack manager Gary Megson after two years in charge, while Alan Irvine is sacked after the same length of time in charge of Championship side Preston North End.

31 December: The decade draws to a close with Chelsea two points ahead of Manchester United at the top of the Premier League. Arsenal is two points behind United in third place, with Tottenham Hotspur, Manchester City, Aston Villa and Liverpool completing the top seven. A surprise challenge for Europe place is coming from newly-promoted Birmingham City, who have collected 32 points from their opening 20 matches. Portsmouth is bottom of the Premier League, with Hull City and Bolton Wanderers completing the relegation zone.

January 2010
3 January: Manchester United suffer a shock exit at home to League One leader Leeds United in the FA Cup third round, their 1–0 defeat being their first defeat at the entry stage of the competition in 26 years.

5 January: The first managerial change of the decade takes place when Owen Coyle leaves Burnley to take over as manager of local rivals Bolton Wanderers.

6 January: Darren Ferguson is appointed manager of Preston North End and declares his ambition to take them into the Premier League and play against his father Sir Alex's Manchester United side.

8 January: Alan Irvine is appointed manager of Sheffield Wednesday.

9 January: Seven of the Premier League fixtures this weekend are postponed due to heavy snow across Britain. Four fixtures survive in the Championship and two will be played in League One, but the whole League Two program is postponed.

13 January: Another shock in the FA Cup third round takes place at Anfield, where Liverpool lose 2–1 to Championship strugglers reading in the replay, casting further doubt on the position of manager Rafael Benítez, whose job has reportedly been on the line for weeks due to sub-standard form by his team. Burnley appoint Brian Laws as their new manager.

18 January: Championship leaders Newcastle United announce a new four-year sponsorship deal with Northern Rock, the bank which has been nationalized for two years after almost collapsing due to the credit crunch which brought on the current recession.

31 January: January draws to a close with Chelsea a point ahead of the nearest challengers Manchester United in the Premier League, with a match in hand. Arsenal, Tottenham Hotspur, Liverpool and Manchester City complete the top six. Burnley, Hull City and Portsmouth occupy the bottom three.

February 2010
19 February: Chester City, the bottom of the Conference Premier with −3 points due to a 25-point deduction imposed upon them for financial problems, are suspended from their league until further notice for breach of league rules. A takeover deal is still in the pipeline for the club, who last season was relegated from the Football League for the second time in a decade.

23 February: Portsmouth, bottom of the Premier League, are reported to be within 72 hours of receivership.

26 February: Portsmouth goes into administration, the first Premier League club to do so. They are set to be deducted nine points and are already bottom of the table with 16 points. The points deduction would leave with just seven points and make relegation almost certain. Chester City, bottom of the Conference National with −3 points after a 25-point deduction for similar financial problems, are expelled from the Conference a year after being relegated from the Football League and were wound-up shortly after. Their expulsion made them the first team at this level to fold mid-season since Newport County in February 1989.

28 February: Manchester United steal the first major silverware of the season by beating Aston Villa 2–1 in the League Cup final at Wembley, retaining the trophy. It is the fourth time they have won the trophy – all of the wins have been under the management of Sir Alex Ferguson. In the Premier League, United are still looking strong contenders for the title as they stand one point behind leaders Chelsea. Arsenal's good form has seen them occupy third place with just two points less than United and a nine-point gap outside their nearest contenders Tottenham Hotspur and Manchester City.

March 2010
3 March: Keith Alexander, manager of League Two strugglers Macclesfield Town, dies suddenly at age 53. Alexander had been manager of the Cheshire club since February 2008 and also been in charge of Lincoln City (twice), Peterborough United and non-league sides Ilkeston Town and Northwich Victoria in a managerial career which began in 1993. He had suffered a near fatal brain aneurysm in November 2003 during his second spell as Lincoln City manager.

8 March: Chester City's expulsion from the Conference Premier is confirmed and their record for this season is expunged, sparking a revised league table which sees Oxford United taking over from Stevenage Borough as leaders, while York City drop out of the playoff zone and Cambridge United move dangerously closer to the relegation zone.

14 March: England captain David Beckham suffers an Achilles tendon injury during a Serie A match for Milan (where he is on loan from the LA Galaxy) and is expected to miss this summer's World Cup.

15 March: Newport County, the former Football League club who reformed in 1989 after going bankrupt and being expelled from the Conference, achieve an early promotion back to the highest division outside the Football League as Conference South champions.

17 March: Portsmouth's nine-point deduction for going into administration is confirmed, making relegation from the Premier League almost certain as they remain bottom of the table but are now 17 points adrift of safety with nine matches left to play.

18 March: Fulham defeat Italian giants Juventus 4–1 on the night and 5–4 on aggregate to progress to the quarter-finals of the UEFA Europa League.

28 March: Southampton defeat Carlisle United 1–4 at Wembley Stadium to win the Football League Trophy.

April 2010
5 April: The first of the promotions and relegations in the Football League are confirmed when Newcastle United seal promotion from the Championship to the Premier League after one season away, while the division's bottom club Peterborough United (in their last match under the management of Jim Gannon before the appointment of Gary Johnson) are relegated back to League One after just one season.

6 April: Arsenal's dreams of a first UEFA Champions League triumph are ended when they are eliminated by Barcelona in the quarter-finals.

7 April: Manchester United's hopes of winning the UEFA Champions League are ended when they are eliminated in the quarter-finals by Bayern Munich on away goals.

8 April: Fulham reach the UEFA Europa League semi-finals with a 3–1 aggregate win over VfL Wolfsburg in the quarter-finals. Liverpool also reach the semi-finals by eliminating Benfica.

10 April: Portsmouth become the first Premier League club to be relegated this season when fellow relegation side West Ham United beat Sunderland 1–0, while West Bromwich Albion are promoted to the Premier League for the fourth time in nine seasons. Chelsea's double hopes are given a massive boost when they defeat Aston Villa 3–0 in the FA Cup semi-final. In the Championship, a 3–0 victory for Nottingham Forest over Ipswich Town guarantees Forest's spot in the 2010 Football League play-offs.

11 April: 24 hours after being relegated without kicking a ball, Portsmouth reach the FA Cup final with a surprise 2–0 win over Tottenham Hotspur in extra-time in the semi-final. Manchester United's hopes of a unique fourth successive top division title are dealt a major blow when mid-table Blackburn Rovers hold them to a goalless draw at Ewood Park.

13 April: Chelsea establish a four-point lead at the top of the Premier League by defeating Bolton 1–0 at Stamford Bridge with a Nicolas Anelka penalty against his former club being the only goal of the match.

17 April: The gap between leaders Chelsea and second placed Manchester United is narrowed down to a single point when a Paul Scholes goal gives United a 1–0 win over Manchester City at the City of Manchester Stadium, while Chelsea suffer a 2–1 defeat to Tottenham Hotspur at White Hart Lane. The two results also see Tottenham take the fourth and final Champions League spot from Manchester City with three match to play. In the Championship, Nottingham Forest and Cardiff City are now certain of a playoff place, with Leicester City and Swansea City completing the top six, and Blackpool being the only club able to reach the playoff zone. Plymouth Argyle now need a run of very good results to avoid joining Peterborough in the drop to League One, while Queens Park Rangers, Scunthorpe United, Watford, Crystal Palace and Sheffield Wednesday are the teams also battling to avoid the drop. Norwich City seal promotion back to the Championship at the first time of asking with a 1–0 away win over fellow promotion contenders Charlton Athletic, and could be joined by any one of the five teams Leeds United, Millwall, Swindon Town, Charlton Athletic and Huddersfield Town. Colchester United and Southampton are the only two clubs now capable of creeping into the playoffs. Notts County seal promotion from the league's bottom tier after six years there, while Rochdale have gained promotion after a record 36 successive seasons at this level. AFC Bournemouth now need only two points from their final three matches to be sure of promotion. In contrast, Grimsby Town now need a miracle to avoid relegation from the Football League and the only teams they could leapfrog are Cheltenham Town, Lincoln City and Barnet. Stevenage Borough seal the Conference Premier title to seal promotion to the Football League 14 years after they last won the title but were denied promotion because their stadium did not meet capacity requirements. Luton Town and Oxford United – arguably the biggest clubs outside the Football League – have comfortably secured playoff qualification along with fellow former Football League members Rushden & Diamonds and York City.

19 April: Newcastle United take the Championship title with a 2–0 win against Plymouth Argyle, which consigns Plymouth to relegation to League One after six years in the Championship.

24 April: Manchester United go top of the Premier League with a 3–1 home win over Tottenham Hotspur (in which 36-year-old Ryan Giggs scores his first two league penalties for them), although Chelsea will regain their lead tomorrow if they defeat Stoke City at Stamford Bridge. Meanwhile, a 1–0 home defeat to Sunderland by Hull City means that the East Yorkshire club will need to record two comprehensive victories from their final two league match and hope that West Ham United are heavily beaten in both of theirs to achieve survival. In the Championship, Watford's survival is confirmed and it is now down to Crystal Palace and Sheffield Wednesday to fight it out and try and avoid joining Plymouth Argyle and Peterborough United in the drop to League One. In League One, Norwich City (already promoted) seal the division title with a 2–0 home win against relegation-threatened Gillingham. Southend United are relegated after being held to a 2–2 draw by Oldham Athletic at Boundary Park. Although nobody can now muscle in on the top six for a playoff place, second-placed Leeds United's automatic promotion hopes are still under threat from Millwall, Swindon Town and Charlton Athletic, while Huddersfield Town has achieved a playoff place at this level for the first time since their relegation from Division One (now the Championship) in 2001, thanks to a 6–0 win at relegated Stockport County. Southampton would now be second if it had not been for their hefty points deduction at the start of the season, but as a result, they have now been left unable to achieve even a playoff place. In League Two, AFC Bournemouth are promoted after two seasons in the division with a 2–0 win at Burton Albion. Grimsby Town's 2–0 away win over already-relegated Darlington keeps their hopes of survival alive, though the only teams they are capable of leapfrogging are Barnet and Cheltenham Town. In the Conference Premier, Stevenage Borough have already been confirmed champions, leaving four former Football League members (Luton Town, Oxford United, Rushden & Diamonds and York City) to contest the playoffs for the second promotion place, while Forest Green Rovers and Ebbsfleet United are relegated to the Conference South. Forest Green Rovers was later reprieved following the demotion of Salisbury City due to a breach of Conference rules.

25 April: Chelsea return to the top of the Premier League with a 7–0 win over mid table Stoke City, giving themselves a one-point advantage over Manchester United as well as a considerably greater goal difference. Burnley's first season back in the top flight for more than 30 years ends in relegation when they are beaten 4–0 at home by a Liverpool side who are now almost certain of Europa League qualification and still have a Champions League place in their sights.

27 April: Notts County take the League Two title with a 5–0 win against relegated Darlington.

29 April: Five men are found guilty of public order offences in connection to violent clashes at a match between Wolverhampton Wanderers and West Bromwich Albion in West Bromwich town center 15 months ago.

May 2010
1 May: Tom Huddlestone scores the only goal of the match as Tottenham Hotspur defeat Bolton Wanderers 1–0 at White Hart Lane, meaning a draw at Manchester City and a win on the final day of the season will end their 20-year wait for a top four finish and put themselves beyond the reach of Liverpool, who for the last four seasons have held a "big four" dominance with Arsenal, Chelsea and Manchester United. Aston Villa, meanwhile, are left with no hope of Champions League qualification after they are defeated 3–1 by a Manchester City side still in the hunt for a place in the top four. In League One, Leeds United remain in second place and needing a win from their final match of the season to guarantee automatic promotion, despite losing 1–0 to a Charlton Athletic side who still have hope of automatic promotion thanks to this win. Millwall blow the chance of creeping into the top two by losing 2–0 to relegation threatened Tranmere Rovers. Swindon Town's 3–2 home win over Brentford keeps the West Country club in the hunt for an automatic return to the league's second tier after a decade away. Huddersfield Town have an outside chance of automatic promotion thanks to an injury time winner by Lee Novak against Colchester United. Wycombe Wanderers are relegated back to League Two after one season in League one after a 2–0 defeat by a Leyton Orient side who are now almost certainly safe. Exeter City and Gillingham are still at risk of relegation. Grimsby Town defeat Barnet 2–0 to ensure that the battle against relegation for both clubs will go down to the last match of the season Cheltenham Town are trounced 5–0 by champions Notts County and as a result are still at risk of losing their Football League status after 11 years, as well as suffering a second successive relegation.

2 May: Chelsea's 2–0 win at Liverpool leaves them needing only a win against Wigan Athletic in a week's time to confirm themselves as Premier League champions, and today's result also confirms the end of the "big four" which has dominated the top of the Premier League for the last four seasons – Liverpool will now finish sixth or seventh, while Tottenham Hotspur or Manchester City will seal the final Champions League place. West Ham United's 3–2 defeat at Fulham means that they will go into the final match of the season knowing that a heavy defeat at home to Manchester City and a heavy win for Hull City at home to Liverpool could see them slide out of the Premier League on goal difference. In the Championship relegation crunch, Sheffield Wednesday go down after only managing a 2–2 draw at home to Crystal Palace, whose safety is confirmed. Blackpool, who last played in the top flight in 1971, qualify for the playoffs. Newcastle United finish the season with 102 points (the highest points tally in their history) by beating mid table QPR 1–0 at Loftus Road. Back in the Premier League, Chelsea could have sealed the title today but Manchester United's 1–0 win at Sunderland ensures that the title race will go down to the wire.

3 May: Hull City's relegation from the Premier League is confirmed after they are held to a 2–2 draw by Wigan Athletic. It is only the third time in 18 seasons of the Premier League that all of the relegation places have been confirmed before the last match of the season. York City and Oxford United reach the Conference Premier playoff final to compete for the second promotion place to the Football League.

5 May: Tottenham Hotspur win 1–0 at Manchester City to seal a Champions League place and take Liverpool's place in the "big four". It is Tottenham's highest finish in 20 years and they will be their first European Cup campaign for 49 years and only their second since the competition's inception.

6 May: Hartlepool United have deducted three points for fielding an ineligible player in their 2–0 win over Brighton on 5 April, meaning they can still be relegated from League One.

8 May: During a topsy-turvy final day, in which changing scores have Millwall, Charlton, Huddersfield and Swindon all in the automatic promotion places at one point, Leeds United seal promotion from League One after three years by winning their final match of the season 2–1 at home to Bristol Rovers, despite going down to 10 men and conceding the first goal. Gillingham are relegated from League One when losing 3–0 at already relegated Wycombe Wanderers. Grimsby Town are relegated from the Football League after 99 years.

9 May: Chelsea win the Premier League title with an 8–0 demolition of Wigan Athletic, meaning that Manchester United's hopes of a unique fourth successive title are ended despite a 4–0 home win over Stoke City. Meanwhile, Liverpool finish in their lowest position for 11 years (seventh), though this season it is enough to achieve UEFA Europa League qualification due to second placed Manchester United being League Cup holders and champions Chelsea being FA Cup finalists. Burnley, already relegated, bow out of the Premier League in style with a 4–2 home win over fourth placed Tottenham Hotspur.

11 May: Gianfranco Zola is sacked after less than two years as manager of West Ham United. However, Steve McClaren, the former Middlesbrough and England manager whose name had been linked with the West Ham job amid previous speculation about Zola's future, is ruled out as a successor after ending his two-year spell at FC Twente of the Netherlands and accepting an offer to manage German side VfL Wolfsburg. A London-based manager makes the headlines for the right reasons as the League Managers Association votes Fulham's Roy Hodgson as manager of the year.

12 May: Fulham lose 2–1 to Atlético Madrid in the UEFA Europa League final at the Nordbank Arena in Hamburg, Germany. Diego Forlán, the former Manchester United striker, had put the Spaniards ahead in the 32nd minute, only for Fulham midfielder Simon Davies to equalise five minutes later. With the scores still level after 90 minutes, the match went into extra time and Forlan won the trophy with his second goal in the 116th minute.

14 May: Wayne Brown, the Leicester City defender, is forced to apologize to his teammates after revealing to them that he voted for the far-right British National Party in last week's general election.

15 May: Chelsea beat Portsmouth 1–0 in the FA Cup final at Wembley. Didier Drogba scored the match's only goal from a second-half free-kick, as Kevin-Prince Boateng and Frank Lampard missed penalties for Portsmouth and Chelsea, respectively. Chelsea's victory in the 2009–10 FA Cup secured the club's first league and cup double, as well as their third FA Cup victory in four years.

16 May: Oxford United beat York City 3–1 in the Conference Premier playoff final at Wembley Stadium to secure a return to the Football League after four years away.

21 May: Avram Grant resigned as manager of Portsmouth.

22 May: Blackpool defeated Cardiff City 3–2 in the Championship playoff final at Wembley Stadium to seal promotion to the Premier League, ending their 39-year exile from the top division of English football.

24 May: England beat Mexico 3–1 in a friendly at Wembley, with goals coming from Ledley King, Peter Crouch and Glen Johnson.

26 May: Following promotion to the Premier League, Blackpool chairman Karl Oyston announces that a new stand will be built at the Bloomfield Road stadium in order to achieve a 16,000 all-seated capacity.

27 May: Steve Cotterill resigns as manager of Notts County despite having led them to promotion from League Two, amid speculation that he is about to replace Avram Grant as Portsmouth manager.

29 May: A Paul Robinson goal gives Millwall promotion to the Championship as they defeat Swindon Town in the League One playoff final.

30 May: Jon Nurse grabs the winner as Dagenham & Redbridge clinch promotion to League One following a 3–2 win over Rotherham United in the League Two playoff final. England beat Japan 2–1 in their final friendly before the World Cup

June 2010
1 June: England's 23-man World Cup squad is announced, with Theo Walcott, who appeared in the 2006 squad despite being only 17, being the most notable exclusion. Crystal Palace are saved from liquidation by a last minute takeover deal.

3 June: Rafael Benítez resigns from Liverpool after six seasons as manager, during which time the Reds won the UEFA Champions League and the FA Cup, but failed to clinch the league title which has eluded them since 1990. Meanwhile, Avram Grant is confirmed as manager of West Ham United.

4 June: England captain Rio Ferdinand is ruled out of the World Cup by a knee injury sustained during training.

8 June: Philippe Senderos leaves Arsenal after seven years and joins Fulham on a three-year contract.

9 June: Chelsea give free transfers to out-of-contract players Joe Cole and Michael Ballack.

10 June: Cardiff City pay off £1.9 million debt with HM Revenue and Customs, removing any threat of club's existence from the High Court. Swindon Town teenager Alex Henshall joins Manchester City for an undisclosed fee.

13 June: England's World Cup campaign begins with a 1–1 draw against the United States.

18 June: England's World Cup hopes are thrown into doubt when they are held to a 0–0 draw with Algeria in their second group match.

23 June: England reach the last 16 of the World Cup with a 1–0 win over Slovenia in their final group match.

27 June: England go out of the World Cup in a 4–1 defeat by Germany.

Retirements

8 October 2009: Stephen Roberts, 29-year-old former Wrexham, Doncaster Rovers and Walsall defender.

22 October 2009: Marc Edworthy, 36-year-old right-back who last played for Burton Albion retired after playing over 500 senior appearances in 18-year career. He played for eight clubs in his career which included spells in the Premier League with Crystal Palace, Coventry City, Norwich City and Derby County.

8 December 2009: Linvoy Primus, 36-year-old Portsmouth defender, after failing to overcome a serious knee injury
but now work ambassadorial role for Portsmouth. He previously played for Charlton Athletic, Barnet and Reading.

11 December 2009: Dean Ashton, 26-year-old West Ham United striker, after failing to make a full recovery from an ankle injury suffered when training with the England team in August 2006.

17 December 2009: Riccardo Scimeca, 34-year-old Cardiff City midfielder formerly of Aston Villa, Leicester City and Nottingham Forest.

6 January 2010: Neil Clement, 31-year-old West Bromwich Albion defender and club's longest serving player after 10 years there, after failing to make a full recovery from a knee injury suffered in August 2008.

6 January 2010: Patrik Berger, 36-year-old Czech midfielder who had spells in England with Liverpool, Portsmouth and Aston Villa before returning to Sparta Prague.

Notable debutants

2 March 2010 – Alex Oxlade-Chamberlain, 16-year-old winger, made his debut for Southampton as a late substitute in a 5–0 home win over Huddersfield Town in League One.
 21 March 2010 – Phil Jones, 18-year-old defender, made his debut for Blackburn Rovers in their 1–1 home Premier League draw to Chelsea.

National team
The home team is on the left column; the away team is on the right column.

Friendly matches

World Cup qualifiers
England were in Group 6 of the 2010 FIFA World Cup qualification process.

Honours

Trophy and league champions

Playoff winners

League tables

Premier League

In one of the most closely fought title races in recent history, Chelsea were crowned Premier League Champions for the second time in five years, breaking the goal-scoring record with 103 goals. Despite the disappointment in the Champions League, the club managed to retain the FA Cup, recording their first domestic double under Carlo Ancelotti. The £80 million departure of Cristiano Ronaldo to Real Madrid in the summer meant Manchester United narrowly missed out on the title, though they managed to retain the League Cup. Arsenal took third place and once again qualified for Europe's elite competition, while Tottenham Hotspur took the final spot for the Champions League by finishing fourth, with the manager Harry Redknapp winning the Premier League Manager of the Year award.

Three teams took the UEFA Europa League spots. Taking fifth place were Manchester City, whose controversial gamble of sacking Mark Hughes at Christmas and replacing him with Roberto Mancini paid off as they finished in their best position in years. Finishing sixth once again were Aston Villa, who again looked like breaking into the top four, but ultimately fell short. Taking seventh place were Liverpool, who were runners-up the year before, but suffered from losing key players, such as Xabi Alonso to Real Madrid, Sami Hyypiä to Bayer Leverkusen and Fernando Torres several times to injury throughout the season; these factors resulted in indifferent form in all of their competitions, meaning they only took a Europa League spot after the FA Cup finalists were refused a UEFA licence and finished in their lowest position for eleven years.

Fulham built on last season's finish of seventh place as they came close to Europa League glory in Hamburg, losing 2–1 in extra time to Atlético Madrid with ex-Manchester United striker Diego Forlán scoring the winning goal. However, critics universally praised manager Roy Hodgson for guiding a club threatened with relegation two seasons previously to the Europa League final. By a wide margin, he won the LMA Manager of the Year award. Birmingham City finished ninth in their best position in the top flight in years, with their season including a twelve match unbeaten run, while fellow promoted side Wolverhampton Wanderers flirted with relegation several times, but ultimately finished in a respectable 15th place.

Portsmouth endured a season of financial worries, a nine-point deduction and four different owners that effectively ended their seven-year stay in the top flight. Hull City failed to emulate their previous season's success and were also relegated. After the departure of promotion-winning manager Owen Coyle at the turn of the year, Burnley's league form under Brian Laws declined rapidly and they were relegated to the Championship after just one season.

Table

Leading goalscorer: Didier Drogba (Chelsea) – 29

Football League Championship

Newcastle United put last season's relegation behind them as they returned to the Premier League at the first attempt, staying top for the majority of the season and losing just four matches under the management of Chris Hughton, remaining unbeaten at home in the process. Roberto Di Matteo's first season in charge of West Bromwich Albion brought success as the Midlands club enjoyed automatic promotion to the top flight for the third time in eight years. They were joined by Blackpool, who were tipped by many as relegation favourites at the beginning of the season. Ian Holloway masterminded the Lancashire club's promotion with a thrilling 3–2 victory over Cardiff City in the play-off final, returning to the top flight for the first time since 1971.

Swansea City occupied a play-off place for most of the season but missed out on the final day, this despite scoring fewer goals than all three relegated sides. Middlesbrough made a strong start to the season, however the mid-season decision to sack Gareth Southgate while still in contention for promotion backfired. Their form subsequently declined under his replacement Gordon Strachan, and they fell out of the promotion race and finished in 11th place.

Peterborough United went straight back down to League One, employing four different managers and propping up the table for the majority of the season. They were soon joined by Plymouth Argyle, who did not win a game until late September and went on a five-match losing streak towards the end of the season, ending six years in the second tier. Crystal Palace, who had been on the brink of the playoffs before being deducted ten points for entering administration, faced Sheffield Wednesday in the final match of the season as they both fought for survival. The match finished 2–2, meaning Palace survived and Wednesday dropped into League One.

Leading goalscorers: Nicky Maynard (Bristol City) – 20, and Peter Whittingham (Cardiff City) – 20

Football League One

After recovering from an embarrassing 7–1 defeat to Colchester on the first day of the season, a turnaround under new manager Paul Lambert and the 24 goals from free-scoring striker Grant Holt saw Norwich City make an immediate return to the Championship. Leeds United secured automatic promotion in the runners-up spot; their season almost fell apart disastrously after they led the table by eight points at the turn of the year and also knocked Manchester United out of the FA Cup. They rebounded in the final weeks of the season and a last day 2–1 victory over Bristol Rovers saw the Yorkshire side end their three-year spell in League One.

Millwall, who narrowly missed out on automatic promotion by just one point, beat Swindon Town in the play-off final, returning to the Championship after a four-year absence.

Despite being deducted ten points and missing out on the play-offs, Southampton managed to win the Football League Trophy and striker Rickie Lambert was the league's top scorer with 31 goals.

Stockport County spent the entire season in administration and were subsequently relegated. Southend United were faced with financial problems and also relegated. Wycombe Wanderers' first season at this level for six years proved a disappointment, and they were immediately relegated back to League Two. Gillingham also suffered an immediate relegation after their play-off victory the previous year, their inability to win an away fixture all season proved to be their downfall. Hartlepool stayed up on goal difference after they received a three-point deduction for fielding an ineligible player, but Gillingham's loss to Wycombe confirmed their survival.

Leading goalscorer: Rickie Lambert (Southampton) – 31

Football League Two

Notts County's season mostly made the headlines for all the wrong reasons, as they were involved in an abortive high-spending takeover by a consortium who brought in Sven-Göran Eriksson as director of football and went through four managers during the season. However, they managed to overcome their off-field problems and won the title. AFC Bournemouth continued their revival under Eddie Howe and won promotion in the runners-up spot. The last automatic promotion spot was taken by Rochdale, who were promoted for the first time since 1969.

Dagenham & Redbridge won the play-offs, reaching the third tier of the Football League for the first time in their 18-year history.

Darlington were unable to recover from losing many of their players during their spell in administration at the end of the previous season and finished bottom of the league, becoming the third club (after Halifax Town and Chester City) to be relegated to the Football Conference on two separate occasions. Grimsby suffered the relegation that they only avoided the previous year due to Luton Town's points deduction; their form improved significantly in the final weeks of the season, but they were ultimately undone by an earlier run of nearly five months without a win and were relegated to the Conference Premier after losing on the final day.

Leading goalscorer: Lee Hughes (Notts County) – 30

Clubs that folded

Deaths
12 July 2009 – Tommy Cummings, 80, former defender who made 479 appearances for Burnley, and was a member of the Clarets' side that won the league championship in 1959–60. Later became player-manager of Mansfield Town, and also had a short spell as Aston Villa manager.
21 July 2009 – Dai Lawrence, 62, former full-back who played four seasons for Swansea City in the late 1960s.
31 July 2009 – Sir Bobby Robson, 76, former inside-forward and manager. As a player, he played for Fulham and West Bromwich Albion, and won 20 caps for England. As manager, he reached even greater heights, being appointed to Ipswich Town in 1969 and over the next 13 years taking them to FA Cup and UEFA Cup glory (also finishing second in the league in his final two seasons as manager), before leaving in 1982 to manage England for eight years during which they reached the quarter-final of the World Cup in 1986 and to the semi-final in 1990, only losing on penalties. He later managed PSV, Porto and Barcelona before returning home to manage his boyhood favourites Newcastle United from 1999 to 2004, during which time they qualified for Europe on three occasions. He was knighted for his services to football in 2002. His death came after a 17-year battle against cancer which had gone into remission four times.
2 August 2009 – Joe Livingstone, 67, former striker who scored 42 goals in 82 appearances for Carlisle United, and also played for Middlesbrough and Hartlepool United.
9 August 2009 – Tommy Clinton, 83, former defender who spent eight seasons at Everton, and was capped three times by the Republic of Ireland. Also played briefly for Blackburn Rovers and Tranmere Rovers.
19 August 2009  – Bobby Thomson, 65, full-back capped eight times by England. He played 278 league matches for Wolverhampton Wanderers, 110 for Luton Town and also played for Birmingham City, Walsall, Port Vale, and in the United States.
13 September 2009 – Paul Shirtliff, 46, former defender who played in The Football League for Sheffield Wednesday and Northampton Town, and also had a long career at non-league level.
24 September 2009 – Terry Bly, 73, former striker who most notably holds the post-war single-season goalscoring record in The Football League, having scored 52 goals for Peterborough United in 1960–61. Also played for Norwich City, Coventry City and Notts County.
26 September 2009 – Geoff Barrowcliffe, 77, former Derby County full-back who spent 16 seasons with the Rams, playing more than 500 first-team matches. He also played for several non-league clubs including Ilkeston Town and Boston United.
5 October 2009 – Tommy Capel, 87, former inside-forward who most notably played five seasons for Nottingham Forest, where he scored 72 goals in 162 appearances. Also played for Manchester City, Chesterfield, Birmingham City, Coventry City and Halifax Town.
8 October 2009 – Alex McCrae, 89, former inside-forward who scored 49 goals in a five-year spell with Middlesbrough in the early 1950s. Also played for Charlton Athletic, and for Hearts and Falkirk in his native Scotland.
12 October 2009 – Stan Palk, 87, former inside-forward who played for Liverpool and Port Vale in the immediate post-war years.
17 October 2009 – David Burnside, 69, former midfielder who played for a number of clubs, but is probably best remembered from his five-year spell with West Bromwich Albion. Some of his other clubs include Southampton, Crystal Palace, Wolverhampton Wanderers and Plymouth Argyle.
21 October 2009 – John Jarman, 78, former Barnsley and Walsall wing-half, who later worked as a coach for Wolverhampton Wanderers, West Bromwich Albion, Mansfield Town and Derby County.
22 October 2009 – Ray Lambert, 87, former Wales international full-back who played more than 300 matches for Liverpool, where he won the 1946–47 league title.
2 November 2009 – Keith Kettleborough, 74, former inside-forward who spent the majority of his career with Rotherham United and Sheffield United, and also had a spell as player-manager at Doncaster Rovers.
7 November 2009 – Billy Ingham, 57, former Burnley midfielder who spent eleven years with the Clarets, playing more than 250 matches for the club before finishing his career with a spell at Bradford City.
15 November 2009 – Ray Charnley, 74, former Blackpool striker who is one of the Seasiders' most prolific scorers of all time, with 222 goals in 407 appearances for the club. He won one England cap while at Blackpool, and also played for Morecambe, Wrexham and Bradford Park Avenue.
15 November 2009 – Don Martin, 65, former striker who scored more than 100 goals in a 16-year career with Northampton Town and Blackburn Rovers.
23 November 2009 – Tony Parry, 64, former central defender who spent the majority of his nine-year professional career with Hartlepool United, and also had a brief spell with Derby County before dropping down to non-league football.
25 November 2009 – Mike Tiddy, 80, former winger who began his career at Torquay United before making over 100 appearances with Cardiff City and Brighton & Hove Albion as well as making over 50 appearances for Arsenal.
29 November 2009 – George Cummins, 78, former inside-forward who began his career at Everton, but spent the majority of his 12-year professional career with Luton Town. He also had a brief spell at Hull City, and was capped 19 times for the Republic of Ireland.
1 December 2009 – Neil Dougall, 88, inside-forward or wing-half who played nearly 100 matches for Birmingham City and more than 300 for Plymouth Argyle, a club he later managed. Capped once for Scotland.
14 December 2009 – Alan A'Court, 75, former Liverpool winger who spent 13 seasons with the Reds, playing 382 matches, before finishing his career at Tranmere Rovers. He was also capped five times by England, and played for his country in the 1958 World Cup.
16 December 2009 – Dennis Herod, 86, former Stoke City goalkeeper who was a member of the team that came within two points of winning the league title in 1946–47, and famously scored a goal for the club in 1952 against Aston Villa. Also played for Stockport County.
20 December 2009 – Jack Brownsword, 86, former left-back who spent nearly his entire career with Scunthorpe United, playing a club-record 597 league appearances for the Iron between 1950 and 1964. Also had a brief spell with Hull City prior to joining Scunthorpe.
22 December 2009 – Albert Scanlon, 74, former Manchester United winger and Busby Babe who survived the Munich Air Disaster. Played 115 league matches for the Red Devils, and was a member of the 1955–56 and 1956–57 championship-winning sides. Later played for Newcastle United, Lincoln City and Mansfield Town.
7 January 2010 – Alex Parker, 74, former full-back who was a member of Everton's 1962–63 championship-winning side, and played for Scotland in the 1958 World Cup. Also played for Falkirk and Southport.
20 January 2010 – Jack Parry, 86, former goalkeeper who played for Swansea Town and Ipswich Town, and was capped once by Wales in 1951.
30 January 2010 – Jackie Newton, 84, former wing-half who spent 12 years with Hartlepool United, making 361 first-team appearances. Began his career at Newcastle United, but failed to make an appearance for the Magpies.
3 February 2010 – Gil Merrick, 88, former Birmingham City goalkeeper and manager who served the club for more than 25 years. As a player, he appeared in 485 league matches for the Blues, and was also capped 23 times by England, playing in the 1954 World Cup. As manager, he won the 1963 League Cup, beating arch-rivals Aston Villa in the final.
11 February 2010 – Petar Borota, 56, Serbian goalkeeper who played for Chelsea between 1979 and 1982, and whose other clubs include Partizan and Porto. Won four caps for the former Yugoslavia.
11 February 2010 – Brian Godfrey, 69, former striker who played for six clubs, most notably Scunthorpe United, Preston North End and Aston Villa, where he played in the 1971 League Cup final. He also won three caps for Wales, and was manager at Exeter City and several non-league clubs.
22 February 2010 – Bobby Smith, 56, former midfielder who spent eight seasons at Leicester City between 1978 and 1986, and also had a long career in his native Scotland, mostly with Hibernian and Dunfermline Athletic.
27 February 2010 – Charlie Crowe, 85, former Newcastle United defender who was a member of the Magpies' 1951 FA Cup winning side. Also played for Mansfield Town at the tail end of his career.
28 February 2010 – Adam Blacklaw, 72, former Burnley goalkeeper who played more than 300 matches for the Clarets, and was a member of Burnley's 1959–60 championship-winning squad. Also played for Blackburn Rovers, and Scotland at international level.
3 March 2010 – Keith Alexander, 53, manager and former striker who was manager of Macclesfield Town at the time of his death, and had also managed Lincoln City and Peterborough United earlier in his career. As player, he was a journeyman striker who spent most of his career in non-league football, but also had a few spells in the Football League, primarily with Grimsby Town and Lincoln City.
4 March 2010 – Tony Richards, 75, former striker who is Walsall's second-leading scorer of all time with 185 league goals for the Saddlers between 1954 and 1963. Also spent three seasons with Port Vale.
15 March 2010 – Charlie Ashcroft, 83, former goalkeeper who spent nine years at Liverpool, mostly as the team's second-choice goalkeeper, and also had spells at Ipswich Town and Coventry City late in his career.
19 March 2010 – Bob Curtis, 60, former right-back who made more than 350 appearances for Charlton Athletic during an 11-year spell at The Valley. Also played for Mansfield Town and Kettering Town.
24 March 2010 – George Luke, 76, former left-winger who spent his entire career in the North East, playing almost 200 matches for Hartlepools United before joining Newcastle United, where he stayed just over a year before finishing his career with Darlington.
6 April 2010 – Sid Storey, 90, former inside-forward who spent nine years at York City, where he played more than 350 matches and scored 42 goals. Also had short spells with Barnsley and Accrington Stanley.
8 April 2010 – Stan Smith, 79, former inside-forward who spent most of his career with Port Vale, and also played for Crewe Alexandra and Oldham Athletic.
11 April 2010 – John Batchelor, 51, controversial former owner and chairman of York City.
13 April 2010 – Charlie Timmins, 87, former Coventry City full-back who spent his entire ten-year professional career at Highfield Road.
21 April 2010 – Tony Ingham, 85, former full-back who spent most of his career at Queens Park Rangers, where he made a club-record 514 league appearances between 1950 and 1963, and later spent many years as QPR's commercial director after retiring as a player. Began his career at Leeds United.
25 April 2010 – Ian Lawther, 70, former Northern Ireland international striker who played 17 seasons in The Football League for six different clubs, most notably Sunderland and Blackburn Rovers. Capped four times for Northern Ireland.
11 May 2010 – Brian Gibson, 82, former Huddersfield Town full-back who played 171 first-team matches for the Terriers, his only club at professional level.
15 May 2010 – Besian Idrizaj, 22, Swansea City striker who died from a heart attack while visiting his family in Austria. He had played three matches for the Swans during the 2009–10 season, and was previously on the books of Liverpool, with loan spells at Luton Town and Crystal Palace. He was also a former Austria under-21 international.

References